Centrists of Galicia (Spanish: Centristas de Galicia, CdG) was a political party in Galicia, based mainly in the province of Ourense between 1985 and 1991.

It emerged as a split from Galician Coalition, bringing together many provincial mayors of the province from the former Union of the Democratic Centre (UCD), who, after the disappearance of the UCD, formed Centrists of Ourense. It contested most elections jointly with the People's Alliance, except in the 1991 municipal elections, which it contested together with Galician Coalition under the Galician Nationalist Convergence label. In the province of Ourense it participated in coalition with the Democratic and Social Centre (CDS) under the name of Centrists of Galicia Convergence. That same year it joined the People's Party. Victorino Núñez and José Luis Baltar were its main leaders.

References

1985 establishments in Spain
1991 disestablishments in Spain
Conservative parties in Spain
Defunct conservative parties
Defunct nationalist parties in Spain
Defunct political parties in Galicia (Spain)
Galician nationalist parties
Political parties disestablished in 1991
Political parties established in 1985